Gabardine is a durable twill worsted wool, a tightly woven fabric originally waterproof and used to make suits, overcoats, trousers, uniforms, windbreakers, outerwear and other garments.

History 

The word gaberdine or gabardine has been used to refer to a particular item of clothing, a sort of long cassock but often open at the front, since at least the 15th century, in the 16th becoming used for outer garments of the poor, and later signifying a rain cloak or protective smock-frock.

The modern use of the term for a fabric rather than a garment dates to Thomas Burberry, founder of the Burberry fashion house in Basingstoke, Hampshire, England, who invented the fabric and revived the name in 1879, and patented it in 1888. Gabardine made its public appearance in 1879 when it was introduced by Burberry Clothing.

Gabardine was an innovative fabric that changed the course of outerwear as well as protective wear design and production. It was a new kind of fabric which was not only lightweight but high in durability and consequently came from its most notable attributes, its breathability and its weatherproofing which revolutionized rainwear.

Production 
The original fabric was worsted wool, sometimes in combination with cotton, and was waterproofed using lanolin before weaving. The fiber may also be pure cotton, texturized polyester, or a blend. 

Gabardine is woven as a warp-faced steep or regular twill, with a prominent diagonal rib on the face and smooth surface on the back. Gabardine always has many more warp than weft yarns.

Gabardine is tightly woven and water-repellent but more comfortable and breathable than rubberised fabrics.

Applications 

Burberry clothing of gabardine was worn by polar explorers, including Roald Amundsen, the first man to reach the South Pole, in 1911 and Ernest Shackleton, who led a 1914 expedition to cross Antarctica. A jacket made of this material was worn by George Mallory on his ill-fated attempt on Mount Everest in 1924.

Gabardine was also used widely in the 1950s to produce colorful patterned casual jackets, trousers and suits. Companies like J. C. Penney, Sport Chief, Campus, Four Star, Curlee, Towncraft, Oxford Clothes, and various California Trends coming from Hollywood Ca. were being produced  such as short-waisted gabardine jackets, sometimes reversible, commonly known as "Ricky" jackets or " Gab Jackets" along with the famous Hollywood Leisure Jackets that had been made since the 1930s. 

Cotton gabardine is often used by bespoke tailors to make pocket linings for suits, where the pockets' contents would quickly wear holes in flimsy pocket lining material.

Clothing made from gabardine is generally labelled as being suitable for dry cleaning only, as is typical for wool textiles.

See also 

 Cambric
 Denim
 Performance (textiles)

References

Notes

Citations

Bibliography
 .
 .
 .

Woven fabrics